Line 1 of the Xuzhou Metro is a rapid transit line in Xuzhou city, Jiangsu province, China. Construction commenced in February 2014, and the line was opened on September 28, 2019. It is the first metro line to open in Xuzhou.

Line 1 runs primarily east-west through Xuzhou's main commercial areas, from Luwo in the west to Xuzhou East railway station in the east. It connects the old city, Bashan area, Chengdong New Area, People's Square, Huaihai Square, and Pengcheng Square. It also connects to both major railway stations in the city.

Opening timeline

Line overview

History 
As of June 2018, the civil engineering work was reported to be 95% complete, leaving mostly track laying, decorations, and electromechanical installations to be completed. On August 30, 2018, railway work was declared complete, and electromechanical installations and decorations declared as "under intense progress".

References 

01
Railway lines opened in 2019